Justice Cornish may refer to:

Albert J. Cornish (1856–1920), associate justice of the Nebraska Supreme Court
Leslie C. Cornish (1854–1925), associate justice and chief justice of the Maine Supreme Judicial Court